John Alexander Ritchie (4 January 1932 – 2 August 2008) was an Australian rules footballer who played with Richmond in the Victorian Football League (VFL).

Notes

External links 		
		
		
					
		
		
1932 births		
2008 deaths		
Australian rules footballers from Victoria (Australia)		
Richmond Football Club players